Bumm Bumm Bole is a 2010 Hindi film directed by Priyadarshan. The film stars Darsheel Safary, Atul Kulkarni, Rituparna Sengupta and newcomer Ziyah Vastani. The film is an authorized adaptation of the 1997 Iranian film Children of Heaven. The Film was released on 14 May 2010. The title of the film is based on one of the songs of Taare Zameen Par.

Plot

Khogiram Maheshwar Gwala, Kalyani Gwala and their children Pinaki (Pinu) and Rimzim are a poor family with not enough money for uniform or shoes. Things become worse when Pinu misplaces Rimzim's only pair of shoes in a vegetable shop. Pinu tells jhilmil about the shoes and begs her not to tell their mother; she agrees. She can't go to school without her shoes.

They work out a scheme where both of them share the same shoes. Rimzim will wear them to school in the morning and hand them off to Pinu at midday so he can attend afternoon classes. However, Pinu always gets into trouble at school waiting for Rimzim to give him the shoes. Rimzim finds the girl wearing her shoes in the school. They talk a little then she takes Pinu to their house to show the place and they find out that family is poorer than them.

A day after, Rimzim is attracted to a new shiny pair of shoes that the same poor girl is wearing. She asks her about what she did with her previous pair of shoes and when she learns that the girl had discarded her old pair of shoes, she is greatly disappointed. Temporarily, Khogiram, desperate for money, borrows some gardening equipment and heads off with Pinu to the rich suburbs of the town to find some gardening work. They try many mansions until a mansion belonging to a 6-year-old girl and her grandmother agreed. While Pinu plays with the six-year-old girl, his father works. Meanwhile, Pinu learns of the Interschool Marathon where one of the prizes is a pair of shoes.

Pinu enters the marathon race in the hope of receiving the third prize of a new pair of sneakers (the first prize being free education to the winner till he completes high school), which he could exchange for girl sneakers and give to Rimzim. He accidentally wins the race and is placed first. He is shocked and cries on the podium as he watches in despair at the new pair of sneakers being awarded to the third placed runner.

The film ends with Rimzim finding out that she will not get a new pair of shoes, but there is a quick shot of their father's bicycle at the end of the movie that shows what appears to be red shoes with red trimming for Rimzim and another pair of white basketball shoes, presumably for Pinu, whose old shoes were torn from so much use.

Cast
Darsheel Safary as Pinaki Gwala aka Pinu 
Atul Kulkarni as Khogiram Maheshwar Gwala, Pinaki and Rimzim's father 
Rituparna Sengupta as Kalyani Gwala, Khogiram's wife 
Ziyah Vastani as Rimzim Gwala, Pinu's sister
Kaveri Jha as Bani, Khogiram's sister
Archana Suseelan as Bubhoni
Ada as Principal
Vikas Rishi as SP Vishwajeet Khatoniyar
Omar as Bishnu, Bani's husband 
Charu as Miss Mahanta, Pinaki's teacher
Pooja as School Teacher
Shailendra Srivastava as Gogai
Nandu as Phookan
Sejal Kulkarni as Hoki

Soundtrack

Reception
Preeti Arora of Rediff.com gave the film 1.5 stars out of 5, writing ″At some point one wonders who the real producer of the film is? An intelligent audience is aware of in-house sponsorship but here a well-known brand of shoes takes up as much screen space as the lead actors.″ Taran Adarsh of Bollywood Hungama gave the film 1.5 stars out of 5, stating ″For those who've watched the Iranian film, you'll realize that BUMM BUMM BOLE is not a patch on that film. And those who haven't watched the Iranian film and would view BUMM BUMM BOLE as an isolated case, BUMM BUMM BOLE still disappoints.″ Sudish Kamath of The Hindu stated ″The film Takes rare talent to mess up a fine film despite remaking it shot by shot. This extended version of Majidi's Children of Heaven drags on and on.″ Shubhra Gupta of The Indian Express gave the film 2 stars out of 5, writing ″Priyan retains a lot of the original (entire scenes are faithfully lifted). But then he gets up to his old tricks of not knowing how to let a good thing be,and inflates the story with terrorists and insurgents and cops and shoot-outs,as well as a leering tea plantation manager who tries molesting the wife : this,in a children's ilm? There's also sloppiness in attention to detail: the nuns who run Pinu's school sport thin sticks ( the better to beat the kids with?) and French manicures: is this a feature of new-age convent schools,or just being Bollywood?″

The Times of India gave the film 3 stars, writing ″Bumm Bumm Bole is fine vacation fare for the family and presents a viable alternative to parents who are looking for meaningful tween entertainment in a boom-boom age.″.

See also
 Children of Heaven, a 1997 Iranian film.
Homerun, a 2003 Singapore adaptation of Children of Heaven.
 Akka Kuruvi, a 2022 Indian Tamil film, and another adaptation of Children of Heaven.

References

External links
 

2010s Hindi-language films
2010 films
Films directed by Priyadarshan
Indian remakes of foreign films
Films scored by M. G. Sreekumar
Films scored by Tapas Relia